Oughterby is a hamlet in the Allerdale district, in the English county of Cumbria. It is near the city of Carlisle and the village of Kirkbampton. For transport there is the B5307 road nearby.

It may be the place referred to in 1430 as "Ughtryghtby", the home of Thomas Jakson, yeoman, supposedly owing money to Robert Heghmour.

References

Hamlets in Cumbria
Kirkbampton